Tōichi is a masculine Japanese given name.

Possible writings
Tōichi can be written using different combinations of kanji characters. Some examples:

東一, "east, one"
東市, "east, city"
唐一, "Tang (Chinese dynasty), one"
唐市, "Tang (Chinese dynasty), city"
藤一, "wisteria, one"
藤市, "wisteria, city"
棟一, "ridgepole, one"
登一, "ascend, one"
桃一, "peach tree, one"
稲一, "rice plant, one"
童一, "child, one"
到一, "arrive, one"

The name can also be written in hiragana とういち or katakana トウイチ.

Notable people with the name
, Japanese painter
, Japanese middle-distance runner
, Japanese Lieutenant

Fictional characters
, a character in the manga series Magic Kaito

Japanese masculine given names